Michael Christian Miller (born 30 May 1979) is an Australian former cricketer. He played first-class cricket for Queensland and South Australia. He was also a part of Australia's squad for the 1998 Under-19 Cricket World Cup.

References

External links
 

1979 births
Living people
Australian cricketers
Queensland cricketers
South Australia cricketers
Cricketers from Toowoomba